The 6th Battalion, 14th Field Artillery Regiment (United States) was a field artillery battalion of the United States Army. The unit nickname follows the 14th Field Artillery nickname "Warbonnets" with the motto "Ex Hoc Signo Victoria" (Victory By This Sign)

Unit assignment
Constituted 1 July 1916 in the Regular Army as Battery F, 14th Field Artillery.
Inactivated 16 January 1988 in Germany and relieved from assignment to the 1st Armored Division.

Lineage
Constituted 1 July 1916 in the Regular Army as Battery F, 14th Field Artillery.
Organized 1 June 1917 at Fort Sill, Oklahoma.
Inactivated 1 September 1921 at Fort Sill, Oklahoma.
(14th Field Artillery assigned 15 December 1922 to the 6th Division; relieved 7 September 1927 from assignment to the 6th Division and assigned to the 7th Division.)
Activated 1 December 1934 at Fort Snelling, Minnesota. Inactivated 1 July 1939 at Fort Snelling, Minnesota. (14th Field Artillery relieved 16 October 1939 from assignment to the 7th Division.) Activated 15 July 1940 Fort Benning, Georgia, as an element of the 2d Armored Division.
Absorbed 8 January 1942 by Battery C, 14th Armored Field Artillery Battalion.
(Battery C, 14th Field Artillery, reorganized and redesignated 8 January 1942 as Battery C,
14th Armored Field Artillery Battalion.) Former Battery F, 14th Field Artillery, reconstituted I April 1957 in the Regular Army and redesignated as Headquarters and Headquarters Battery,
6th Battalion, 14th Artillery. Activated 15 April 1963 at Fort Sill, Oklahoma
(organic elements constituted 27 February 1963 and 15 April 1963).
Battalion inactivated 4 December 1970 at Fort Lewis, Washington.
Redesignated I September 1971 as the 6th Battalion 14th Field Artillery.
Assigned 13 September 1972 to the 1st Armored Division and activated in Germany.
Inactivated 16 January 1988 in Germany and relieved from assignment to the 1st Armored Division.

Campaign participation credit

World War II

Sicily (with arrowhead)
Normandy
Northern France
Rhineland
Ardennes-Alsace
Central Europe

Vietnam War

Defense
Counteroffensive
Counteroffensive, Phase 11
Counteroffensive. Phase III
Tet Counteroffensive
Counteroffensive, Phase IV
Counteroffensive, Phase V
Counteroffensive, Phase VI
Tet 69/Counteroffensive
Summer-Fall 1969
Winter-Spring 1970
Sanctuary Counteroffensive
Counteroffensive, Phase VII

Decorations
Presidential Unit Citation (Army), Streamer embroidered (14th Armored Field Artillery Battalion cited; WD GO 108, 1945)
Presidential Unit Citation (Army), Streamer embroidered PROVINCE (6th Battalion 14th Artillery, cited; DA GO 40, 1967)
Meritorious Unit Commendation, Streamer embroidered 1965–1967 (6th Battalion 14th Artillery, cited; DA GO 48, 1968)
Belgian Fourragere 1940 (14th Armored Field Artillery Battalion cited; DA GO 43, 1950)
Cited in the Order of the Day of the Belgian Army for action in the ARDENNES (14th Armored Field Artillery Battalion cited; DA GO 43, 1950)
Cited in the order of the Day of the Belgian Army for action in Belgium (14th Armored Field Artillery Battalion cited; DA GO 43, 1950)
Republic of Vietnam Cross of Gallantry with Palm, Streamer embroidered VIETNAM 106-0-1970 (6th Battalion 14th Artillery, cited; DA GO 55, 1971)
Republic of Vietnam Cross of Gallantry with Palm, Streamer embroidered VIETNAM 1970 (6th Battalion 14th Artillery, cited; DA GO 1974)
Battery A additionally entitled to Presidential Unit Citation (Army embroidered PLEIKU PROVINCE (Batteries A and B, 6th Battalion 14th Artillery, cited; DA GO 69, 1969)
Battery B additionally entitled to Presidential Unit Citation (Army) Streamer embroidered PLEIKU PROVINCE (Batteries A and B, 6th Battalion, 14th Artillery, cited; DA GO 69, 1969), and Valorous Unit Award, Streamer embroidered DAK TO-BEN HET (Battery B, 6th Battalion, 14th Artillery, cited; DA GO 48, 1971)
Battery C additionally entitled to Presidential Unit Citation (Army) Streamer embroidered DAK TO DISTRICT (Battery C. 6th Battalion 14th Artillery, cited; DA GO 38, 1971)

Killed in action

Vietnam War
Wyles, Donald C., Pvt. – Field Artillery – United States Army, A Btry 6th Battalion 14th Artillery, I Field Force Vietnam Artillery  Date of action: 10 June 1966 – Listing at The Virtual Wall
Whitehead, William C., Major – Field Artillery – United States Army, 6th Battalion 14th Artillery, I Field Force Vietnam Artillery 0076P2L Date of action: 30 June 1968 – Listing at The Virtual Wall
Kelly, George T. III, First Lieutenant – Field Artillery – United States Army, Battery C, 6th Battalion 14th Artillery, I Field Force Vietnam Artillery, APO 96350 Awarded: Distinguished Service Cross Date of action: 22 April 1970 Theater: Republic of Vietnam Read Remembrances – Listing at The Virtual Wall
Musich, John P., SP4 – Field Artillery – United States Army, 6th Battalion 14th Artillery, I Field Force Vietnam Artillery 91B20 Date of action: 30 October 1970 –  Listing at The Virtual Wall
Owens, Carl E., SP4 – Field Artillery – United States Army, 6th Battalion 14th Artillery, I Field Force Vietnam Artillery 13A10 Date of action: 30 October 1970 – Listing at The Virtual Wall
Richardson, Gary W., SP4 – Field Artillery – United States Army, 6th Battalion 14th Artillery, I Field Force Vietnam Artillery 52B20 Date of action: 30 October 1970 – Listing at The Virtual Wall

External links
The 6/14 Arty Website
14th Field Artillery Regiment Association

Bibliography

Lamerson, John D., The Phantom of Ben Het, Vietnam: The Missing Chapter. Lamerson Publishing, 2001 The Phantom of Ben Het
Blumenson, Martin. Breakout and Pursuit. United States Army in World War II. Washington: Government Printing Office, 1961.
Coleman, J. D., ed. 1st Air Cavalry Division, Memories of the First Team, Vietnam, August 1965 – December 1969.
Tokyo: Dai Nipon Printing Co., 1970. Contains information about the 6th Battalion 14th Field Artillery.
Dutchak, Eugene, ed. 2d Armored Division, Fort Hood, Texas, 1961 – Topeka: Josten Military Publications, 1962. Contains information about the 1st Battalion 14th Field Artillery.
Harrison, Gordon A. Cross-Channel Attack. United States Army in World War II. Washington: Government Printing Office, 1951 Historical Division, War Department. Utah Beach to Cherbourg (6–27 June 1944).  *American Forces in Action. Washington: Government Printing Office, 1945.
Houston, Donald E. Hell on Wheels: The 2d Armored Division. San Rafael, California: Presidio Press, 1977.
Marshall, S.L.A. West to Cambodia. New York: Cowles Education Corporation, 1968. Contains information about the 6th Battalion 14th Field Artillery.
"Readiness Shown by 'Project Partnership.'" Field Artillery Journal (September–October 1974):61. Pertains to the 6th Battalion 14th Field Artillery.
2d Armored Division "Hell on Wheels," Fort Hood, Texas, 1965. Baton Rouge: Army and Navy Publishing Co., 1965. Contains information about 1st Battalion 14th Field Artillery.
Trahan, E. A., ed. A History of the Second United States Armored Division, 1940–1946. Atlanta: Albert Love Enterprises, 1947.

014 6
Military units and formations established in 1916
Military units and formations disestablished in 1988